This article provides details of international football games played by the Denmark women's national football team from 2020 to present.

Results

2020

2021

2022

2023

Forthcoming fixtures
The following matches are scheduled:

Head-to-head records
Correct as of 21 February 2023

FIFA Top 20 
Correct as of 18 February 2023

Notes

References

Denmark women's national football team
2020s in Danish sport